Alex Yowan Kevin Moucketou-Moussounda (born 10 October 2000) is a Gabonese professional footballer who plays for Cypriot club Aris Limassol FC and the Gabonese national team.

Club career

Early career
Moucketou-Moussounda began his senior career in his native Gabon with Mangasport before moving to AS Bouenguidi in 2020.

Aris Limassol
In the summer of 2021 he moved to Aris Limassol in the Cypriot top league. He made his debut against Ethnikos Achna on 2 November.

International career
On 11 October 2021, Moucketou-Moussounda made his debut for Gabon in a 2–0 win over Angola. He was called up to the Gabon squad for a series of 2023 Africa Cup of Nations qualifiers in December 2021, playing in three matches and scoring a goal.

Career statistics

Club

International

References

External links
 
 
 Alex Moussounda at Aris Limassol FC
 

 

2000 births
Living people
Sportspeople from Libreville
Gabonese footballers
Gabon international footballers
Association football defenders
Aris Limassol FC players
Gabon Championnat National D1 players
Cypriot First Division players
Gabonese expatriate footballers
Gabonese expatriates in Cyprus
Expatriate footballers in Cyprus
2021 Africa Cup of Nations players